Renee Woodman-Wickliffe (née Wickliffe; born 30 May 1987) is a New Zealand rugby union player. She represents  and Auckland. She was in the squad that won the 2010 Rugby World Cup and the 2013 Rugby World Cup Sevens.

Biography 
Wickliffe was named in the Black Ferns squad to the 2014 Women's Rugby World Cup. She was included in the Black Ferns squad for the 2015 Women's Rugby Super Series in Canada and was named in the squad for the 2017 Rugby World Cup.

In 2019 she was part of the winning team of the Super Series, scoring a hat-trick in the final deciding game against England.

Wickliffe was named in the Chiefs squad for the inaugural season of Super Rugby Aupiki in 2022. She was called in as an injury replacement for the Black Ferns squad to the 2022 Pacific Four Series.

Wickliffe made the Black Ferns 32-player squad for the delayed 2021 Rugby World Cup. She scored a brace of tries against a scoreless Scotland in the Black Ferns final pool game .

Personal life 
Wickliffe has been in a long-term relationship with fellow Black Fern and World Cup winner Portia Woodman since 2013, and they married in December 2022. They have both adopted the surname Woodman-Wickliffe.

References

External links
 Renee Wickliffe at Black Ferns

1987 births
Living people
New Zealand women's international rugby union players
New Zealand female rugby union players
New Zealand female rugby sevens players
New Zealand women's international rugby sevens players
Female rugby sevens players
Auckland rugby union players
Counties Manukau rugby union players
LGBT rugby union players
New Zealand LGBT sportspeople